Wells S. Jones (August 3, 1830 – March 21, 1914) was an American physician, politician, and soldier. He served as an infantry officer in the Union Army in the Western Theater during the American Civil War, and was breveted a brigadier general near the end of the conflict. After the war, Jones studied to become a doctor at Starling Medical College, precursor to the Ohio State University College of Medicine.

Early life
Wells S. Jones was born in 1830 in Paxton Township, within Ross County, Ohio.

Civil War service

When the American Civil War began in 1861 Jones volunteered for service in the Union Army. On October 3 he was elected captain of the 53rd Ohio Infantry Regiment, and saw action as such during the Battle of Shiloh and the Siege of Corinth. On May 2, 1862, Jones became colonel of the 53rd Ohio and its commanding officer. He led his regiment during the Siege of Vicksburg and at the battle of Missionary Ridge, both in 1863. Jones saw further action throughout the 1864 Atlanta Campaign, fighting at Resaca, Dallas, Kennesaw Mountain and Atlanta. In August, Jones was appointed to brigade command when his superior officer, Brigadier General Joseph A. J. Lightburn was wounded and relinquished command for the remainder of the war.  Colonel Jones now led the 2nd Brigade in William B. Hazen's 2nd Division of the XV Corps at Jonesboro.  Coincidentally, the 1st Brigade of that division was also led by another "Colonel Jones", Theodore Jones of the 30th Ohio.  Wells Jones participated in the 1864 March to the Sea, and was wounded during operations around Fort McAllister, Georgia, on December 13.

On March 13, 1865, Jones was breveted a brigadier general, cited for "gallant and meritorious services" during the war. He was mustered out of volunteers in the Union Army on August 11.

Postbellum
After the war, Jones attended and graduated from Starling Medical College, Columbus, Ohio, in 1866. He also married Mary Frances Molineaux Wetmore, and the couple had at least one child together, Mary Kathleen born in 1886. Jones died in 1914 at Waverly, Ohio, and was buried in that city's Evergreen-Union Cemetery.

Notes

References
 Eicher, John H., and Eicher, David J., Civil War High Commands, Stanford University Press, 2001, .
 Hunt, Roger H., and Brown, John R., Brevet Brigadier Generals in Blue, Olde Soldier Books, 1990, revised 1997, .

Further reading
Duke, John K., History of the 53rd Regiment Ohio Volunteer Infantry during the War of the Rebellion, 1861 to 1865, Blake Printing Company, Portsmouth, OH, 1900.

External links

 rootsweb.ancestry.com A history of the 53rd Ohio Infantry.

1830 births
1914 deaths
People of Ohio in the American Civil War
Union Army colonels
People from Ross County, Ohio
Ohio State University College of Medicine alumni